Christine Hancock (born 12 Feb 1943) was the General Secretary of the Royal College of Nursing from 1989 to 2001.

She attended Orpington Girls Grammar School (now Newstead Wood School for Girls), and then began her nursing career at King's College Hospital in London. After various clinical nursing posts she became a ward sister or head nurse at the National Heart Hospital in London in a cardiac and coronary care unit doing advanced research.

She graduated from the London School of Economics and also worked as a midwife and a mental health nurse.  A career in nursing management led to her becoming Chief Executive of the NHS in Waltham Forest in north-east London.  
In 1989 she began a twelve-year period as General Secretary/Chief Executive of the Royal College of Nursing www.rcn.org.uk
She was elected unopposed as the 24th President of the International Council of Nurses in 2001.  In 2009, she established C3 Collaborating for Health, a London-based charity with a global vision of stemming the epidemic of chronic disease through prevention.
She was a governor of De Montfort University in Leicester from 2006 to 2015 and since 2007 has been a Trustee of the House of St Barnabas, a London charity helping homeless people get work. www.hosb.org.uk

References

Place of birth missing (living people)
Living people
Nurses from London
British nursing administrators
Alumni of the London School of Economics
People educated at Newstead Wood School
1943 births
Royal College of Nursing